The Garden City Golf Club is a private golf course in Garden City, New York. The club was founded in 1899, and is also known as the "Garden City Men's Club" or simply the "Men's Club" to distinguish it from the Garden City Country Club, and Cherry Valley Club, all of which are located in Garden City, NY. It remains one of the few men-only golf clubs in the United States.

The course first opened on May 29, 1897 as the Island Golf Links, a nine-hole layout for guests of the Garden City Hotel. The expanded course was incorporated as the Garden City Golf Club on May 17, 1899. Its club house was designed by Richard Howland Hunt.

Garden City Golf Club hosted the U.S. Open in 1902, which was won by Laurie Auchterlonie. It marked the first time that a player had shot lower than 80 in all four rounds. Amateur Walter Travis, a founding member of the Garden City Golf Club, finished second in the tournament. A few years later, Travis redesigned the layout of his home course, adding numerous bunkers and modifying the greens. During the U.S. Amateur at the Garden City Golf Club, Travis hit a ball into a new pot bunker near the eighteenth green, which led to his defeat in a semifinal match against Jerry Travers. In addition to hosting the U.S. Amateur in 1908, Garden City Golf Club also hosted the tournament in 1900, 1913, and 1936. Garden City was also the host of the Walker Cup in 1924.

After the death of Walter Travis, the Garden City Golf Club renamed its Spring Invitational to the Walter J. Travis Invitational in 1927. Held annually since 1902, it has now become one of the premier mid-amateur golf tournaments in the New York metropolitan area.

In 2013, the Garden City Golf Club was ranked 26th overall in Golf Magazines list of the Top 100 Courses in the U.S., 47th in Golf Magazines list of the Top 100 Courses in the World, 55th in Golf Digests list of America's 100 Greatest Golf Courses, and 9th among Golf Digest's golf courses in New York City.

Course Layout

References

External links
GCGC on Golf Club Atlas.com

1899 establishments in New York (state)
Garden City, New York
Golf clubs and courses designed by Devereux Emmet
Golf clubs and courses in New York (state)
Sports venues completed in 1899
Sports venues in Hempstead, New York
Walker Cup venues